Lorinda Munson Bryant (21 March 1855 − 13 December 1933) was an American writer and educator.

Biography
She was born near Granville, Ohio, in 1855 to Marvin M. Munson, a lawyer, and Emma Sabin Culbertson. In 1875, she married Charles W. Bryant, a druggist; he died in 1886, and Lorinda Bryant took over running his drug store. She received a Bachelor of Science degree from Granville Female College in 1892. The next year, she studied at the Chicago College of Pharmacy, and after further studies at Denison University, she became the first woman in Ohio to be a registered pharmacist. She subsequently studied science at Cornell University, and later founded the Montrose School for girls in South Orange, New Jersey. The school closed in 1905, and Bryant turned to writing, eventually publishing over twenty books.  A History of Painting, published in 1906, was among her most successful books.

Her other works include What Pictures to See in America (1915), Famous Pictures of Real Animals (1918), Bible Stories in Bible Language (1922), The Children's Book of Celebrated Bridges, The Children's Book of Celebrated Towers, and The Children's Book of European Landmarks,

She was a member of the American Geographical Society and of the National Board of Review of Motion Pictures.

References

External links
 
 

1855 births
1933 deaths
People from Granville, Ohio
American women educators
American non-fiction writers
American children's writers
Denison University alumni
Cornell University alumni
American women children's writers
American women non-fiction writers
Educators from Ohio